Federico Fellini (1920–1993) was an Italian film director and screenwriter.

Fellini may also refer to:

People
Giulio Cesare Fellini (born c. 1600), Italian painter
Maddalena Fellini (1929–2004), Italian actress and writer
Riccardo Fellini (1921–1991), Italian film actor

Film
Fellini: A Director's Notebook, an Italian documentary
Fellini: I'm a Born Liar, a 2002 French documentary

Other uses
Fellini (band), a Brazilian rock band
5150 Fellini, a minor planet

See also

Federico Fellini International Airport